Tekken Hybrid is a 2011 fighting video game collection released exclusively for the PlayStation 3. It consists of the film Tekken: Blood Vengeance (as a Blu-ray 3D format), with a remastered version of Tekken Tag Tournament and a demo version of Tekken Tag Tournament 2 called Tekken Tag Tournament 2 Prologue. Tekken: Blood Vengeance is accessible if the disc is loaded onto any Blu-ray player. Tekken Tag Tournament HD is based on the original PlayStation 2 version and features updated HD visuals, while including trophies.

Gameplay

Gameplay in Tekken Tag Tournament HD was virtually unchanged from the original game, however there was a bump in visual quality as the aspect ratio was changed to fit 16:9, and ran in full 1080p HD, running at 60 frames per second.

Plot

Both Tekken Tag Tournament and its sequel are non-canon entries of the series. Despite this, all of the characters have a real-time ending shown over the credits for the first character chosen when selecting the two fighters. Unknown's ending, however, is an FMV instead.

Characters

All 34 characters from the original game are present in the HD version. However, unlike the original, all of the characters are available from the start, a contrast to characters being locked in the arcades and PlayStation 2 versions of the game. Four characters from the sequel were available in Tekken Tag Tournament 2 Prologue.

Playable characters in Tekken Tag Tournament HD

 Originally a new character 
 Originally unlockable 
 Unplayable in arcade-version 
 Costume/palette swap

Playable characters in Tekken Tag Tournament 2 Prologue
Devil Kazuya
Devil Jin
Ling Xiaoyu
Alisa Bosconovitch

Release
A limited edition version was released alongside the standard version, which included an art book, selected soundtracks of both Tekken Tag Tournament and Tekken Tag Tournament 2, and PlayStation Home content.

Reception

Tekken Hybrid received a mixed critical reception, earning a metascore of 65/100, indicating "mixed or average reviews". While the restoration of the original game was praised, many critics considered the lack of online play to be a missed opportunity. The film was considered lackluster, and Tekken Tag Tournament 2 Prologue was criticized for its lack of characters.

Notes

References

2011 video games
PlayStation 3 games
PlayStation 3-only games
Fighting games
Tag team videogames
Bandai Namco video game compilations
Video game remakes
Video games developed in Japan
Hybrid